Galomecalpa tamaria is a species of moth of the family Tortricidae. It is found in Bolivia.

The wingspan is about 27 mm. The ground colour of the forewings is orange at the costa postmedially, but pale brownish in other areas. The markings are dark brown. The hindwings are grey, strigulated (finely streaked) with brownish grey.

Etymology
The species name refers to the type locality: Villa Tamari in Bolivia.

References

Moths described in 2013
Euliini